A kago is a type of vehicle formerly used in Japan.

Kago or KAGO may refer to:
 Kago language, spoken in Ivory Coast
 KAGO (AM), a radio station (1150 AM) licensed to serve Klamath Falls, Oregon, United States
 KAGO-FM, a radio station (94.9 FM) licensed to serve Altamont, Oregon
 KFXX-FM, a radio station (99.5 FM) licensed to serve Klamath Falls, Oregon, which held the call sign KAGO-FM from 1980 to 2017
 Magnolia Municipal Airport (ICAO code KAGO)

People with the name 
 Ai Kago (born 1988), Japanese singer, actress and author
 Danson Kago (born 1994), Kenyan footballer
 Gervais Kago (born 1987), footballer from the Central African Republic
 Shintaro Kago (born 1969), Japanese manga artist

See also 
 Cago, a rock album
 Cagot, a historic minority of France and Spain